Eric Francis MacKenzie (December 6, 1893 – August 20, 1969) was a Roman Catholic bishop.

Born in Boston, Massachusetts, MacKenzie was ordained to the priesthood on October 20, 1918, for the Roman Catholic Archdiocese of Boston. He earned a doctorate in canon law from the Catholic University of America, his dissertation being: "The Delict of Heresy in Its Commission, Penalization, Absolution, (CUA diss. 77, 1932) 116 pp." On July 11, 1950, he was appointed titular bishop of Alba and auxiliary bishop of the Boston Archdiocese and was ordained bishop on September 14, 1950.

Notes

1893 births
1969 deaths
Clergy from Boston
20th-century American Roman Catholic titular bishops
Roman Catholic Archdiocese of Boston